Jacques-Antoine Dassier (1715–1759) was a Genevan medallist. He was active in London, as James Anthony Dassier, from 1740 to the mid-1750s.

Life
He was born in Geneva on 15 November 1715, the son of Jean Dassier. He received lessons in drawing and engraving from his father.

At 17, Dassier was sent to Paris for instruction from the silversmith Thomas Germain. In 1736 he went to Italy. He stayed at Rome for one year (1737), studied art, and made a medal of Pope Clement XII. At Turin he took the portrait of the king of Sardinia in wax, completing it as a medal on his return to Geneva, where he stayed for some time as an assistant to his father.

In 1740 Dassier went to England, In 1741 he was appointed assistant engraver to the Royal Mint, with a salary and lodging: the duties were light. He visited Geneva in 1743 (again in 1745) and, on his way, in Paris, made a wax portrait of Montesquieu from the life, producing a medal from it in 1753.

About 1756, George II permitted Dassier leave England for St. Petersburg, where he worked on the coinage of the Empress Elizabeth, and made medals of Count Schouwalov and of the Empress. During his three years' stay his health worsened, and he was returning to England, when he died at Copenhagen, in the house of Count Bernstorf, on 2 October 1759.

Works
At the beginning of his time in England, Dassier printed proposals for making medals of 13 distinguished living Englishmen by subscription. This series, with subjects largely from Whig political and Royal Society circles, was carried out 1740–1744. The dies were engraved in London, then the medals were struck off at Geneva.

The table below lists all Dassier's English medals; they have a bust for the obverse, and normally, for the reverse, an inscription in an ornamental border. (The original 13 candidates had Richard Mead in place of the Duke of Marlborough, the other 12 being Argyll, Barker, Barnard, Carteret, Chesterfield, Folkes, Halley, de Moivre, Pope, Pulteney, Sloane, Walpole.)

Dassier was less prolific than his father. On the other hand, the initial portrait series has been considered "perhaps the most accomplished medals produced in England during the eighteenth century". Dassier's signatures were I. (or J.) A. Dassier; I. Dassier (rare); Ja. Ant. Dassier; A. Dassier; A. Das.

Notes

External links

Attribution

1715 births
1759 deaths
Medallists
Engravers from the Republic of Geneva
18th-century artists from the Republic of Geneva